Gunnlaugsson is a surname of Icelandic origin, meaning son of Gunnlaugur. In Icelandic names, the name is not strictly a surname, but a patronymic.

People named Gunnlaugsson include:

Arnar Gunnlaugsson (born 1973), Icelandic professional football player
Bjarki Gunnlaugsson (born 1973), Icelandic professional football player
Björn Gunnlaugsson (1788–1876), Icelandic mathematician and cartographer
Darryl Gunnlaugson, Canadian curler
Eyþór Ingi Gunnlaugsson (born 1989), Icelandic singer
Garðar Gunnlaugsson (born 1983), Icelandic professional football player
Hrafn Gunnlaugsson (born 1948), Icelandic filmmaker of Viking films
Sigmundur Davíð Gunnlaugsson (born 1975), Icelandic politician, former Prime Minister

Icelandic-language surnames